Day for Night is the fourth studio album by the Canadian rock band The Tragically Hip. It is named for the film of the same name.

Commercial performance
The album was very successful in Canada, with domestic sales of 300,000 units within four days of its release. It was the band's first album to debut at #1 on the Canadian Albums Chart. The album has been certified 6× platinum in Canada. Promotional tours for the album included stints touring with The Rolling Stones and Page and Plant. In the Netherlands, Day for Night peaked at #70.

Saturday Night Live
The band appeared on Saturday Night Live in 1995, thanks in large part to the finagling of fellow Canadian and Kingston-area resident Dan Aykroyd. A fan of the band, Aykroyd appeared on the show just to introduce them, despite John Goodman being the host of the episode. The band performed two songs from Day for Night, "Grace, Too" and "Nautical Disaster".

Critical reception

In Have Not Been the Same, the authors note that "the initial response was mixed" due to the "darkness" of the album and its stemming "from the unconscious.". Although AllMusic.com's rating is a lukewarm 3 out of 5, the review calls the album's "signature lyrical mysteries... lush, but much more dark-spirited" than previous albums. "Day for Night stands on the minimalism of Downie's poignancy -- nothing is overproduced and the songs themselves are left alone to arrive on their own." In Chart, Jason Schneider wrote that this was the album that made The Tragically Hip more than "just a rock 'n' roll band... miraculously, the vast distances they had been absorbing for the previous five years merged with the equally limitless vistas of Gord Downie's imagination via a Daniel Lanois-inspired sonic canvas. Day For Night got inside the Canadian psyche in a terrifying way that simple nationalistic tall tales never could. The songs remain gloriously impenetrable, but their landscapes feel like home."

In ChartAttack's three Top 50 Canadian Albums of All Time polls, the album placed #37 in 1996, #13 in 2000 and #21 in 2005.

Track listing
All songs were written by The Tragically Hip.

Credits

The Tragically Hip
Gord Downie – lead vocals
Rob Baker – lead guitar
Paul Langlois – rhythm guitar
Gord Sinclair – bass guitar, backing vocals
Johnny Fay – drums

Additional personnel
Greg Calbi – mastering
Jim Herrington – photography
Mark Howard – producer, engineer, mixing
Andrew McLachlan – design
Simon Andrew – drawing
Mark Vreeken – producer, engineer, mixing

References

Links
 Official website

1994 albums
The Tragically Hip albums
Rock albums by Canadian artists
MCA Records albums